Antônio Maria Mucciolo (May 1, 1923 – September 29, 2012) was an Italian-born prelate of the Catholic Church in Brazil.

Mucciolo was born in Castel San Lorenzo, Italy and ordained a priest on November 4, 1949.  Mucciolo was appointed bishop of the Diocese of Barretos on May 26, 1977, and was ordained bishop on August 15, 1977. Mucciolo was appointed archbishop of the Archdiocese of Botucatu  on May 30, 1989, where Vieira served until his retirement on June 7, 2000.

See also
Archdiocese of Botucatu
Diocese of Barretos

External links
Catholic-Hierarchy
Archdiocese of Botucatu 

20th-century Roman Catholic archbishops in Brazil
1923 births
2012 deaths
Italian expatriates in Brazil
Roman Catholic archbishops of Botucatu
Roman Catholic bishops of Barretos